Crawford Independent School District is a public school district based in Crawford, Texas (USA).

Located in McLennan County, small portions of the district extend into Coryell and Bosque counties.

Crawford ISD has two campuses: 
Crawford High School (Grades 7-12), 
Crawford Elementary School (Grades PK-6) (2004 National Blue Ribbon School).

In 2009, the school district was rated "exemplary" by the Texas Education Agency.

References

External links 
Crawford ISD

School districts in Bosque County, Texas
School districts in Coryell County, Texas
School districts in McLennan County, Texas